Sekiu may refer to:
Sekiu, Washington, a CDP (census designated place).
Sekiu Airport, near the CDP.
Sekiu River, also near the CDP.